Cimolomyidae is a family of fossil mammal within the extinct order Multituberculata. Representatives are known from the Upper Cretaceous and the Paleocene of North America and perhaps Mongolia. The family is part of the suborder Cimolodonta. Other than that, their systematic relationships are hard to define. Some authors have placed the taxon within Taeniolabidoidea. Kielan-Jaworowska and Hurum (2001) expressly don't.

The family Cimolomyidae was named by Othniel Charles Marsh in 1889.

Notes

References 
 Marsh (1889), "Discovery of Cretaceous Mammalia. Part II". Am. J. Sci. 3, 38, p. 81-92.
 Kielan-Jaworowska Z & Hurum JH (2001), "Phylogeny and Systematics of multituberculate mammals". Paleontology '44, p. 389-429.
 Much of this information has been derived from   MESOZOIC MAMMALS: "basal" Cimolodonta, Cimolomyidae, Boffiidae and Kogaionidae, an Internet directory.

Cimolodonts
Paleocene extinctions
Late Cretaceous first appearances
Prehistoric mammal families